Charles William Harrison (born April 25, 1941) is an American former professional baseball player. He was a first baseman in Major League Baseball who played between  through  for the Houston Astros (1965–1967) and Kansas City Royals (1969, 1971). He was signed by the Houston Colt .45s (the Astros' original nickname) in 1963 out of the Texas Tech University.
 
A native of Abilene, Texas, he attended Abilene High School. He was a good athlete with an excellent glove work, who unfortunately lacked the prototypical power for a first baseman. His most productive season came in 1966, when he posted career numbers in games (119), batting average (.256), runs (52), RBI (52), hits (111) and extra-base hits (34), including three four-hit games. But in 1967 Harrison became expendable with the emergence of Doug Rader at first base. (Rader actually became an excellent third baseman.) At the end of the season, he was sent by Houston along Sonny Jackson to the Atlanta Braves in the same transaction that brought Denny Lemaster and Denis Menke to the Astros. A year later, he was purchased by the Royals from Atlanta.
 
In a five-season career, Harrison was a .238 hitter (241-for-1012) with 17 home runs and 126 RBI in 328 games, including 94 runs, 43 doubles, six triples, and three stolen bases. At first base, he committed just 22 errors in 2464 chances for a .991 fielding percentage.

External links
  
Retrosheet

1941 births
Living people
Baseball players from Texas
Denver Bears players
Durham Bulls players
Houston Astros players
Kansas City Royals players
Major League Baseball first basemen
Oklahoma City 89ers players
Omaha Royals players
Richmond Braves players
San Antonio Bullets players
Sportspeople from Abilene, Texas
Texas Tech Red Raiders baseball players